America First Field (formerly Rio Tinto Stadium and referred to as The RioT) is an American soccer-specific stadium in Sandy, Utah, that serves as home stadium for Major League Soccer club Real Salt Lake and National Women's Soccer League club Utah Royals FC. The stadium opened on October 9, 2008, and seats 20,213 for soccer, but can be expanded to over 25,000 for concerts.

The stadium hosted the 2009 MLS All-Star Game, the second leg of the 2011 CONCACAF Champions League Finals, and the final of the 2013 Lamar Hunt US Open Cup. It was also a host stadium during the 2013 CONCACAF Gold Cup, and a host for final stages of the 2015 CONCACAF Men's Olympic Qualifying Championship.

The stadium hosted the National Women's Soccer League (NWSL) team Utah Royals FC during their first stint of existence from 2018 to 2020, and will host the team for their return in the 2024 season.

Rio Tinto's sponsorship of the stadium was set to expire in December of 2020 but retained its branding through 2021.  Real Salt Lake sought a ten-year commitment from its next stadium naming rights partner. On September 10, 2022, RSL announced a naming rights agreement with America First Credit Union, with the stadium subsequently renamed America First Field with immediate effect.

Approval history
In 2005 a soccer-specific stadium for the team was approved for Sandy, a suburb of Salt Lake City. However, funding for the stadium was still hard to come by. A vote in early 2006 struck down a funding proposal for the stadium. However, Tom Dolan, the mayor of Sandy, said that he would not give up on his fight to approve the proposal in Sandy. The funding plan was revised, but was struck down later in 2006 over disagreements in the appropriation of millions of hotel-tax dollars for a financially unproven sports franchise. The proposal for Sandy was declared "dead" by Real Salt Lake owner Dave Checketts at that point, putting the team's future in doubt. Checketts said that he wanted the team to remain in Utah, but would sell it if a proposal was not put forward by August 12, 2006.

Parties from several cities, including Rochester, New York and St. Louis, Missouri, expressed interest in purchasing the franchise and moving it. Other stadium sites in the area were also proposed, including the Utah State Fairgrounds in Salt Lake City, and the tiny town of Vineyard, just west of Provo. Finally, on the very day Checketts had set as a deadline to have a stadium plan in place or decide to sell the team, and after months of up and down discussions with local municipalities, county, and state officials and a change in the funding structure, a tacit agreement between Checketts, Sandy City, and Salt Lake County was put in place, and Real Salt Lake announced that they would move forward with the construction of Real Salt Lake Stadium, which would ultimately be named Rio Tinto Stadium. The groundbreaking, coinciding with the Xango Cup, Real's match against international power Real Madrid, took place that afternoon featuring elected leaders, team officials, as well as the entire rosters of both Real Salt Lake and Real Madrid. On August 15, the deal was officially approved by the Salt Lake County Council.

The stadium plan encountered difficulties however after the Debt Review Committee of Salt Lake County voted against the stadium proposal 4–0 on January 26, 2007, citing what they saw as Real Salt Lake's financial inviability as the reasoning behind the lack of support. County Mayor Corroon concurred with the DRC and the stadium plan was effectively killed on January 29, 2007. In response Real Salt Lake's owner announced the team would be sold and likely move out of the Salt Lake area after the 2007 season.

The Sandy Stadium proposal was not completely dead, however: a new stadium proposal was made on February 2, that would divert 15 percent, roughly $2 million a year, of the county's hotel taxes to the stadium project beginning in July until 2017. Such a deal would have to have been made by February 9, or the deal would have been completely off. The bill was passed by the State Senate.

After Governor Huntsman made a move that would allow the team to remain in Salt Lake County: the Utah House approved House bill 1SHB38, by a 48–24 margin, effectively approving $35 million towards the development of Real Salt Lake's new home. The governor was expected to sign the bill, and ultimately did so.

Sandy City, along with the state of Utah and representatives of the team, finally came to an agreement regarding the placement of the Real stadium. The deal was shot down about a week prior to the agreement by the Salt Lake County Mayor Peter Corroon saying it was too risky. However, Utah's governor, Jon Huntsman Jr. said that soccer was here to stay. The $110 million stadium was built in Sandy, a suburb of Salt Lake City. Rossetti's California office was the architecture firm responsible for the design of the new stadium. The stadium's opening date was set for October 9, 2008, when Real Salt Lake hosted the New York Red Bulls.

Construction history

After considering sites in downtown Salt Lake City, Vineyard, and Provo, a soccer-specific stadium for Real Salt Lake was approved for the city of Sandy, a suburb of Salt Lake City, in late 2005; however, funding for the stadium was hard to come by. A vote in January 2006 struck down a funding proposal for the stadium, and the project was declared "dead" by owner Dave Checketts on January 29, putting the team's future in doubt. Parties from cities such as Rochester, New York, and St Louis, Missouri, expressed interest in purchasing the franchise and moving it, and Checketts announced that the team would likely be sold and moved out of the Salt Lake area by the end of the 2007 season.

In response to the rejection of the stadium plan, local construction company Anderson Geneva offered the club  of land on which to build the stadium just east of Interstate 15 in Sandy for free, at an estimated loss on the price of the land at US$10 million. The move prompted the club to make a new proposal to the Utah State Senate on February 2, 2006, in which 15% of the hotel taxes collected in Salt Lake County between July 2007 and 2017, equaling about US$2 million a year, would be diverted to the project. The bill was passed by the Senate, allowing for the club to announce the commencement of building what was then known as "RSL Stadium".

The groundbreaking of the stadium took place on August 12, 2006, featuring elected leaders of the state of Utah, as well as team officials and the rosters of both Real Salt Lake and Spanish club Real Madrid, who were due to play each other in a Xango Cup match a few days after the fact.

On September 28, 2008, it was announced that the naming rights to the stadium were sold to international mining company Rio Tinto, owners of local mining operation Kennecott Utah Copper. A 15-year deal was set into place, worth between $1.5 million and $2 million per year.

The stadium opened on October 9, 2008, in a Major League Soccer match between Real Salt Lake and the New York Red Bulls.

Use

Club soccer

Because the stadium was under construction throughout 2008 and did not open until late in the year, most of Real Salt Lake's 2008 season was spent in their original home at Rice-Eccles Stadium, on the grounds of the University of Utah in downtown Salt Lake City. The first match (and first event overall) held within the stadium was a Major League Soccer match between RSL and the New York Red Bulls on October 9, 2008, which ended in a 1–1 draw between the two in front of a then-sellout crowd of 20,008 people. A few weeks later, the stadium also played host to the first playoff game in RSL history against Chivas USA, in which the home side ended up winning 1–0 in front of another sellout crowd.

On July 29, 2009, the stadium played host to the 2009 Major League Soccer All-Star Game between a team of MLS All-Stars and Premier League side Everton. The game initially ended as a 1–1 tie, leading to a penalty shootout in which the English side emerged as champions. It was the first time that a foreign team had defeated the All-Stars since the creation of the game.

Throughout 2010 and 2011, the stadium became one of the toughest venues to play at in Major League Soccer, with Real Salt Lake having an undefeated streak of 34 games at home. At the time, it was the longest undefeated streak achieved by any team in MLS history; the record has since been broken by the Houston Dynamo, who won their 35th home game on April 14, 2013.

On April 27, 2011, the stadium played host to the second leg of the 2011 CONCACAF Champions League Finals between RSL and Liga MX club CF Monterrey, for the chance to represent the continent at the 2011 FIFA Club World Cup. The Mexican side ended up winning the game 1–0, and thanks to a 2–2 draw back in Mexico during the first leg, Monterrey were declared the champions on aggregate score.

The stadium hosted the final of the 2013 Lamar Hunt U.S. Open Cup between RSL and D.C. United on October 1, 2013, with the away side winning the cup 1–0 in front of over 17,000 spectators.

As home to the Royals, America First Field also boasts hosting the second highest attendance in the NWSL, third highest of any professional women's team in America.

In 2021, America First Field also hosted home matches for Vancouver Whitecaps FC as COVID-19 cross-border restrictions imposed by the Canadian government prevented the team from playing matches in Canada.

International soccer
Since the stadium opened its doors, it has become a very popular place for the United States men's national soccer team to play matches against regional opponents. The first match held by the team at the stadium took place on September 9, 2009, against El Salvador, in a fourth-round qualifier for the 2010 FIFA World Cup; the game ended in a 2–1 victory for the home side in front of 19,000 spectators. The team returned to the stadium on June 18, 2013, in a fourth-round qualifier game for the 2014 FIFA World Cup against Honduras; the home side once again won at the stadium, this time a 1–0 victory in front of 20,250 people.

The stadium was used as a host stadium during the 2013 CONCACAF Gold Cup, and hosted two back-to-back games for Group C on July 13, 2013. In the first game, the United States defeated Cuba by a score of 4–1, while in the second, Costa Rica pulled out a 1–0 win against Belize; both games took place in front of a crowd of 17,597 spectators.

On June 9, 2021, the USMNT defeated Costa Rica 4–0 in front of 19,007 fans at America First Field, in a friendly match played following the CONCACAF Nations League.

The United States women's national soccer team has also played three matches against international opponents at the stadium. The first game was played on March 31, 2010, as a friendly match against Mexico; in the first winter game ever played by the US team, the home side ended up winning the match 1–0, thanks to a second half goal by Abby Wambach. The second game took place as another friendly match on June 30, 2012, against Canada; once again, the home side ended up winning the game, 2–1, in front of 16,800 spectators. The third game was a friendly match on September 13, 2014, against Mexico; the home side ended up winning 8–0.

Additionally, the stadium hosted the 4 knockout stage matches of the 2015 CONCACAF Men's Olympic Qualifying Championship. These included a 2–0 Honduras victory over the United States and a 2–0 Mexico victory over Canada in the semifinals, then a 2–0 United States victory over Canada in the third place game and a 2–0 Mexico victory over Honduras in the final.

Football

Since 2011, the stadium has played host to the XFINITY High School Football Challenge, a series of games that pits local teams Alta and Jordan against opponents from across the country. In the 2013 edition, the Alta Hawks took on the Bergen Catholic Crusaders of New Jersey, while the Jordan Beetdiggers faced the Allentown Redbirds, also of New Jersey. This game was discontinued after the 2013 edition.

The stadium has also hosted the Zion's Bank Top of the Mountains Bowl, a bowl game of the NJCAA, since 2008. This game was discontinued after the 2011 edition.

Rugby
America First Field has been used on several occasions for rugby matches. The first rugby match in the stadium took place between college sides BYU and Utah in March 2010, and was also used as the site of the 2011 USA Rugby Championship, in which UC-Berkeley defeated BYU 21–14. The following year BYU faced Arkansas State University in the final, defeating them. In May 2014, the Varsity Cup Collegiate Rugby National Championship final match saw BYU defeat UC-Berkeley 43–33 in front of 10,172 fans.

Utah Warriors played an exhibition game against Glendale Raptors at America First Field on March 30, 2018, ahead of their inaugural Major League Rugby season in front of 9,186 fans.

Concerts

Attendance records (soccer)

Real Salt Lake games

Utah Royals FC games

International games

Men's

Women's

Sponsorship

On September 20, 2008, it was announced that the naming rights to the stadium would be awarded to international mining company Rio Tinto, the owners of the local Kennecott Utah Copper mining company and its Bingham Canyon Mine on the west side of the Salt Lake Valley. A 10-year naming deal was signed, valued at around $1.5 million to $2 million a year. The stadium bore the Rio Tinto name even after its naming rights agreement with the company expired, until inking a new deal with America First Credit Union, already a sponsor of the club since its inaugural season.

Other major sponsors within the stadium include Maverik, Vivint, Budweiser, and Zions Bank.

Transportation
The stadium is located near the interchange between US Highway 89 (State Street) and Utah State Route 209 (9000 South), and is easily accessible from Interstate 15; however, parking near the stadium is very limited. The stadium is also accessible by light rail via the Blue Line of UTA TRAX; the nearest station is Sandy Expo on 9400 South.

See also

 List of soccer stadiums in the United States

References

External links

 Stadium website
 Rio Tinto Stadium at StadiumDB.com
 MLS article on groundbreaking, August 12, 2006

Major League Soccer stadiums
Real Salt Lake
Rugby union stadiums in Salt Lake City
Sports venues in Salt Lake County, Utah
Soccer venues in Utah
Sports venues completed in 2008
USL Championship stadiums
2008 establishments in Utah
CONCACAF Gold Cup stadiums
Buildings and structures in Sandy, Utah